Arctiarpia is a genus of moths in the family Erebidae.

Species
Arctiarpia fluviatalis
Arctiarpia melanopasta
Arctiarpia mossi

References
Natural History Museum Lepidoptera generic names catalog

Phaegopterina
Moth genera